Pierre Ouellette is a Canadian academic, broadcast executive, and president of the Université de l'Ontario français in Toronto. He was formerly president of the Université de Hearst from 2011 until 2016 and was director of Radio-Canada's French-language Ontario unit from October 11, 2016 until 2021.

He is a native of Harty, Ontario and is a historian by training.

Notes

References

External links

20th-century Canadian historians
Canadian university and college chief executives
Canadian television executives
Canadian Broadcasting Corporation people
Year of birth missing (living people)
Living people